Bueng Kan, also spelled Bung Kan, is the 76th province (changwat) of Thailand, established by the Act Establishing Changwat Bueng Kan, BE 2554 (2011) on 23 March 2011. The province, consisting of the districts (amphoe) partitioned off Nong Khai province, lies in upper northeastern Thailand also called Isan. It is named after its central district, Mueang Bueng Kan.

Geography
The province is in the northeastern corner of Thailand. It borders, from the south clockwise, Nakhon Phanom, Sakon Nakhon, and Nong Khai province. To the north and east it borders Bolikhamsai province of Laos, with the Mekong River forming the boundary.
Hin Sam Wan (which translates into English as Three Whale Rock) is a 75-million-year-old rock formation protruding out of the mountains. It is so named because, from certain angles, the rocks look like a family of whales.

National park
There is one national park, along with six other national parks, make region 10 (Udon Thani) of Thailand's protected areas.
 Phu Langka National Park,

Wildlife sanctuary
There is one wildlife sanctuary in region 10 (Udon Thani) of Thailand's protected areas.
 Phu Wua Wildlife Sanctuary,

History
In 1994, Sumet Phromphanhao, a member of the House of Representatives from Nong Khai province, proposed that the province of Bueng Kan be established by consolidating the Bueng Kan, Seka, So Phisai, Bung Khla, Bueng Khong Long, Pak Khat, Phon Charoen, and Si Wilai Districts of Nong Khai province as a new province. The new province, if created, would be 4,305 km2, with a population of about 390,000 inhabitants. At that time, the Ministry of Interior replied that creating a new province would load a heavy burden to the state budget and was contrary to the resolution of the Council of Ministers.

The proposal to create Bueng Kan province was tabled for about 20 years, until 2010 when the Ministry of Interior renewed the project and made a proposal to the Council of Ministers to have a "Bill Establishing Changwat Bueng Kan, BE..." considered. In a poll at the time, 99 percent of the inhabitants of Nong Khai province supported the proposal. On 3 August 2010, the Council of Ministers resolved to present the bill to the National Assembly, citing that the proposal met its criteria for approval.

On 7 February 2011, the National Assembly approved the bill. Prime Minister Abhisit Vejjajiva presented it to King Bhumibol Adulyadej for royal assent. Bhumibol Adulyadej signed the bill on 11 March 2011, enacting it as the "Act Establishing Changwat Bueng Kan, BE 2554 (2011)". The act was published in the Government Gazette on 22 March 2011 and came into force the next day.

Economy
Building of the fifth Thai–Lao Friendship Bridge began in 2021. Construction of the bridge is expected to take 3 years for a completion in 2023. The project will link Bueng Kan province with Laos' Bolikhamsai province across the Mekong River. Its cost will be around US$130.3 million. Thailand has agreed to pay US$25.47 million and Laos is covering  about US$46.13 million. The bridge will enable Vietnam to be reached by road from Thailand through Laos over a distance of only 150 km. Already existing Thai-Lao Friendship Bridges link Nong Khai province with Vientiane Prefecture (First Thai–Lao Friendship Bridge; Mukdahan with Savannakhet (Second Thai–Lao Friendship Bridge); Nakhon Phanom with Thakhek (Third Thai–Lao Friendship Bridge); and  Chiang Rai province with Houayxay (Fourth Thai–Lao Friendship Bridge).

Symbols
The provincial seal of Bueng Kan, Thailand's 76th and newest province, has a depiction of Phu Thok, a mountain in Si Wilai District, an Isan language name which means 'lonely mountain'.

The provincial flower and tree is Bauhinia sirindhorniae K. and S.S. Larsen.

Climate
Bueng Kan's climate consists of a wet season and a dry season (between December and January). The temperature decreases during November and is at its lowest in December and January. The temperature quickly increases in March, and peaks in April.

Administrative divisions

Provincial government

The province is divided into eight districts (amphoe). The districts are further divided into 53 subdistricts (tambon) and 615 villages (muban).

 Mueang Bueng Kan
 Phon Charoen
 So Phisai
 Seka
 Pak Khat
 Bueng Khong Long
 Si Wilai
 Bung Khla

Local government

As of 5 August 2020 there are: one Bueng Kan Provincial Administrative Organization - PAO and eighteen municipal (thesaban) areas in the province. The capital Bueng Kan has town (thesaban mueang) status and seventeen subdistrict municipalities (thesaban tambon). 

The non-municipal areas are administered by 39 Subdistrict Administrative
Organizations (SAO) (ongkan borihan suan tambon).

Human achievement index 2017

Since 2003, United Nations Development Programme (UNDP) in Thailand has tracked progress on human development at sub-national level using the human achievement index (HAI), a composite index covering all the eight key areas of human development. National Economic and Social Development Board (NESDB) has taken over this task since 2017.

References

External links
Tourism Thailand
Bueng Kan Travel Guide E-Book - Tourism Authority of Thailand

 
Isan
Provinces of Thailand
Populated places on the Mekong River
States and territories established in 2011